Esso Petroleum Co Ltd v Harper’s Garage (Stourport) Ltd [1967] UKHL 1 is an English contract law case, concerning the restraint of trade through a tying arrangement.

Facts
Harper’s Garage agreed to accept all petrol for its two stations from Esso for a long period of time, a solus agreement. It agreed to keep the garage open at all reasonable hours and not to sell it without ensuring that the buyer entered a similar agreement. One agreement was for 5 years, the other for 21 years.

Judgment
The House of Lords held that the 5-year agreement was valid and the 21-year agreement was invalid.

Lord Reid said he ‘would not attempt to define the dividing line between contracts which are and contracts which are not in restraint of trade’. It was preferable ‘to ascertain what were the legitimate interests of the [suppliers] which they were entitled to protect and then to see whether these restraints were more than adequate for that purpose.’

Significance

In Peninsula Securities Ltd v Dunnes Stores (Bangor) Ltd [2020] the Supreme Court invoked the Practice Statement to depart from Esso with Lord Wilson stating:

See also

English contract law

Notes

References

English contract case law
House of Lords cases
1967 in case law
1967 in British law
Standard Oil
ExxonMobil litigation